Rimpy Kaur "Mahie" Gill (born 19 December 1975) is an Indian actress, working in the Hindi and Punjabi film industries. She is best known for her role of Paro in Anurag Kashyap's critically acclaimed Hindi film Dev.D, a modern take on Sarat Chandra Chattopadhyay's Bengali novella Devdas, for which she also won the 2010 Filmfare Critics Award for Best Actress. She started her career in Punjabi films before making a debut in Bollywood with Dev.D.

She consequently gained recognition after portraying Madhavi Devi, a sexually frustrated wife in Saheb, Biwi Aur Gangster, as well as its sequel, Saheb, Biwi Aur Gangster Returns.

Early life and education
Gill was born in Chandigarh in a Punjabi Jat Sikh family on 19 December in 1975. She completed her master's degree in theater from Panjab University, Chandigarh in 1998.

Career
Gill got her first break with the Punjabi based Bollywood film Hawayein and has done a couple of Punjabi films along with theatre. Anurag first saw her at a party and instantly finalized her to play the character of Paro in the movie Dev D. She worked in Ram Gopal Verma's Not a Love Story, which was based on the Niraj Grover Murder case of 2008. She also worked in Saheb, Biwi Aur Gangster with Jimmy Sheirgill and Randeep Hooda, which was released on 30 September 2011. This movie earned her a nomination at the Filmfare Awards for Best Actress.

Gill appeared in Paan Singh Tomar with Irrfan Khan. It is the true story of an athlete who became a dacoit. In this, she played the title character's wife. Gill made her debut with Apoorva Lakhia's film Toofan, simultaneously shot with the Hindi version, Zanjeer. She did her first ever item number in Tigmanshu Dhulia's film Bullett Raja.

Mahie Gill to be next seen in upcoming web series '1962 The War In The Hills', directed by Mahesh Manjrekar. The series features Abhay Deol, Sumeet Vyas, Akash Thosar.

Personal life
Gill lives in Goa with her boyfriend and has a daughter, Veronica.

Filmography

Films

Web series

Awards and nominations

Filmfare Awards
 2010: Best Actress (Critics); Dev.D
 2012: Best Actress; Saheb, Biwi Aur Gangster (nominated)

Screen Awards
 2010: Most Promising Newcomer – Female; Dev.D

IIFA Awards
 2010: IIFA Star Debut Award; Dev.D
 2010: Best Actress; Dev D (nominated)
 2012: Best Actress; Saheb Biwi aur Gangster (nominated)

BIG Star Entertainment Awards
 2013: Most Entertaining Actor in a Thriller Film – Female; Saheb, Biwi Aur Gangster Returns

References

External links

 
 
 

Living people
1975 births
21st-century Indian actresses
Actresses in Hindi cinema
Actresses in Punjabi cinema
Actresses from Chandigarh
Bigg Boss contestants
Indian film actresses
Filmfare Awards winners
Screen Awards winners
International Indian Film Academy Awards winners
Indian Sikhs
Punjabi people